Quintin Bennett Gill  (born 27 November 1959) is a British politician, who was a Member of the House of Keys (the lower house of parliament of the Isle of Man) for Rushen between 2001 and 2011.

He had been elected twice: in November 2001 (his first attempt) and in November 2006, before losing his seat in the September 2011 election, to Independent challenger Laurence Skelly. Before he was a politician, he was a social worker and a probation officer. Gill was the chairman of the Manx Electricity Authority until 2011.

Governmental and parliamentary positions (selection)
 Chairman of the Isle of Man Office of Fair Trading, 2004–08
 Chairman of the Manx Electricity Authority, 2008–11
 Political Member of various government departments, 2002–11
 Deputy Speaker of the House of Keys, 2010–11

Personal life
Gill has been married to Joy (née McCaffrey) since 1989, they have three daughters together and live in Port St Mary, Isle of Man.

References

Living people
People from Blackburn
Members of the House of Keys 2001–2006
Members of the House of Keys 2006–2011
1959 births